Nasolo's shrew tenrec (Microgale nasoloi) is a species of mammal in the family Tenrecidae. It is endemic to Madagascar. Its natural habitats are subtropical or tropical moist montane and dry forests.

References

Afrosoricida
Mammals of Madagascar
Mammals described in 1999
Taxonomy articles created by Polbot